The Palace of Queen Arwa was the residence of the Yemeni Queen Arwa al-Sulayhi, who ruled in the 11th century CE. It is located in the town of Jibla. The palace is today in a ruined state, although there are efforts to restore it. As the report submitted by Min. of Culture - General Organization for the Preservation of Historic Cities - President Office to UNESCO, the extensive ruins of the Queen's Palace had 365 rooms.

Gallery

References

External links 
 The Palace of Queen Arwa al-Sulaihi in Zi Jibla, Yemen

Palaces in Yemen
Sulayhid dynasty
11th-century architecture